Gladys Mae West (née Brown; born October 27, 1930) is an American mathematician known for her contributions to the mathematical modeling of the shape of the Earth, and her work on the development of the satellite geodesy models that were eventually incorporated into the Global Positioning System (GPS). West was inducted into the United States Air Force Hall of Fame in 2018. West was awarded the Webby Lifetime Achievement Award at 25th Annual Webby Awards for the development of the satellite geodesy models.

Early life and education 
West was born as Gladys Mae Brown in Sutherland, Virginia, in Dinwiddie County, a rural county south of Richmond. Her family was an African-American farming family in a community of sharecroppers. She spent much of her childhood working on her family's small farm. Her mother worked at a tobacco factory. Her father was a farmer who also worked for the railroad. West realized early on that she did not want to work in the tobacco fields or factories like the rest of her family, and decided that education would be her way out.

When West was on her way to graduate high school, the only obstacle keeping her from higher education was financial. Her parents tried to save but supporting an entire family on a sharecropper's wage did not leave much left for West's education. West began babysitting to help save but, ultimately, her superior academic performance resulted in her securing two scholarships. At West's high school, the top two students of each graduating class received full scholarships to Virginia State College (now formally University), a historically black public university. West  graduated as valedictorian in 1948, and received the much needed scholarship. She was initially unsure what college major to pursue at VSU, as she had excelled in all her subjects in high school. She was encouraged to major in science or mathematics because of their difficulty, and West ultimately chose to study mathematics, a subject mostly studied at her college by men. She also became a member of the Alpha Kappa Alpha sorority. West graduated in 1952 with a Bachelor of Science in mathematics. After graduating, she taught math and science for two years in Waverly, Virginia. West then returned to VSU to complete her Master of Mathematics degree, graduating in 1955. Afterward, she briefly took another teaching position in Martinsville, Virginia.

Career 

In 1956, West was hired to work at the Naval Proving Ground in Dahlgren, Virginia, (now called the Naval Surface Warfare Center), where she was the second black woman ever hired and one of only four black employees. West was a programmer in the Naval Surface Warfare Center Dahlgren Division for large-scale computers and a project manager for data-processing systems used in the analysis of satellite data. Concurrently, West earned a second master's degree in public administration from the University of Oklahoma.

In the early 1960s, she participated in an award-winning astronomical study that proved the regularity of Pluto’s motion relative to Neptune. Subsequently, West began to analyze data from satellites, especially satellite altimeters such as GEOS 3, putting together models of the Earth's shape. She became project manager for the Seasat radar altimetry project, the first satellite that could remotely sense oceans. 
West consistently put in extra hours, cutting her team's processing time in half. She was recommended for a commendation in 1979.

From the mid-1970s through the 1980s, West programmed an IBM 7030 Stretch computer to deliver increasingly precise calculations to model the shape of the Earth; an ellipsoid with additional undulations, known as the geoid. Generating an extremely accurate geopotential model required her to employ complex algorithms to account for variations in gravitational, tidal, and other forces that distort Earth's shape. In her autobiography, West spoke of some of the complex problems she solved, which had proven too difficult for other members of the team. West's model ultimately became the basis for the Global Positioning System (GPS).

In 1986, West published Data Processing System Specifications for the Geosat Satellite Radar Altimeter, a 51-page technical report from The Naval Surface Weapons Center (NSWC). The guide was published to explain how to increase the accuracy of the estimation of geoid heights and vertical deflection, important components of satellite geodesy. This was achieved by processing the data created from the radio altimeter on the Geosat satellite, which went into orbit on March 12, 1984.

West worked at Dahlgren for 42 years, retiring in 1998. After retiring, she completed a PhD in Public Administration from Virginia Tech.

Legacy

West's vital contributions to GPS technology were rediscovered when a member of West's sorority Alpha Kappa Alpha read a short biography Gladys had submitted for an alumni function.

West was inducted into the United States Air Force Hall of Fame in 2018, one of the highest honors bestowed by Air Force Space Command (AFSPC). The AFSPC press release at the time called her one of "the so-called 'Hidden Figures' part of the team who did computing for the US military in the era before electronic systems", a reference to the 2016 book by Margot Lee Shetterly, which was adapted into the film Hidden Figures. Capt. Godfrey Weekes, commanding officer at the Naval Surface Warfare Center Dahlgren Division in 2018, described the role played by West in the development of Global Positioning System: "She rose through the ranks, worked on the satellite geodesy, and contributed to the accuracy of GPS and the measurement of satellite data. As Gladys West started her career as a mathematician at Dahlgren in 1956, she likely had no idea that her work would impact the world for decades to come." West agreed, saying that she had no idea at the time that her work would affect so many: “When you’re working every day, you’re not thinking, 'What impact is this going to have on the world?' You're thinking, 'I've got to get this right.'"

As an alumna of Virginia State University Dr. Gladys West was nominated and won the award for "Female Alumna of the Year" at the Historically Black Colleges and Universities Awards sponsored by HBCU Digest in 2018.

West was selected by the BBC as part of their 100 Women of 2018. In 2021, she was awarded the Prince Philip Medal by the UK's Royal Academy of Engineering, their highest individual honour.

Personal life
She met her husband Ira West at the Naval Surface Warfare Center Dahlgren Division, where he also worked as a mathematician. They were two of only four black employees at the time. They were married in 1957. They have three children: Carolyn, David and Michael and seven grandchildren. The West family went to Chapel on the Proving Ground every Sunday. , West lives in King George County, Virginia.

Before being hired by the base, West initially turned down the job due to its location and the requirement to interview. West didn't have a car and couldn't find Dahlgren on a map, along with her fear that they would reject her after the interview because of her race, she decided she'd wait to hear back from other applications. Much time went by, and no other applications were accepted elsewhere. Luckily, Dahlgren reached out to her again, offering her the job without the need to interview. The job was offering twice the salary as her current teaching position and no other job opportunities were coming in. Being hired solely on her qualifications, with a salary that would eventually help her support her family, was a rare find for a black woman at that time.

At this time, The Supreme Court had made a landmark decision on Brown vs. Board of Education that ruled that American state laws establishing racial segregation in public schools were unconstitutional. However, Virginia was still segregated since the Supreme Court had not specified which states were required to reestablish in accordance to the new ruling. This contributed to West's nervousness about taking the job in a rural part of a Southern state. Different groups like the Ku Klux Klan were still at large and the prospect of moving to a rural neighborhood in a southern state was daunting for an unmarried black woman. However, West wouldn't let the ignorance of others derail her on the path she felt God had destined her to go on.

The Civil Rights movement was in full swing during her time at the base. Though she supported the movement, she could not participate in protests because she was a government employee. In Boomtown, where married people lived on base, she was part of a club of black women who discussed civil rights topics.

During her career, she encountered many hardships because of racism against African Americans, primary of which was the lack of recognition she received while working, while her white coworkers received praise and added privileges. Within her biography, her disappointment at not being granted the projects that included travel and exposure is clear.

In 2018, West completed a PhD via a distance-learning program with the School of Public and International Affairs at Virginia Tech.

West continues to prefer using a paper map over a (GNSS based) navigation system, saying she still trusts her brain above all. She stated, "I'm a doer, hands-on kind of person. If I can see the road and see where it turns and see where it went, I am more sure."

Publications

See also 
Irene Fischer
List of African-American women in STEM fields

References

Further reading 
 

People from Dinwiddie County, Virginia
American women mathematicians
People associated with the Global Positioning System
1930 births
Living people
American geodesists
People from King George County, Virginia
Virginia Tech alumni
Virginia State University alumni
African-American mathematicians
Scientists from Virginia
20th-century American mathematicians
20th-century American scientists
20th-century American women scientists
BBC 100 Women
20th-century women mathematicians
Mathematicians from Virginia
Computer programmers
University of Oklahoma alumni
African-American computer scientists
American women computer scientists
American computer scientists
20th-century African-American women
20th-century African-American people
21st-century African-American people
21st-century African-American women